Warwick Racecourse is a horse racing course in Warwick, England. It is a National Hunt racing course and has a programme of 25 meetings throughout the year, many of which are televised. The first stand was built in 1808, and its most recent redevelopment was completed in 2018. In the racecourse is a nine-hole golf course and a golf driving range. The area is a popular place for local people to walk their dogs. There is parking next to the course and it is a five-minute walk away from the town centre.

End of Flat racing
In 2014, Jockey Club Racecourses, who run Warwick, announced plans for a 17-fixture all-Jumps race programme from 2015 and a vision for the Midlands track to become regarded as one of the UK's leading small Jumps courses within the next five years. The course had formerly staged both Flat racing and National Hunt racing but was forced to abandon Flat racing after an incident in May 2014 in which a horse, Artful Lady, had to be euthanized after a fall at the track. Four fixtures due to be staged at Warwick were transferred to other courses, and at the end of July the decision to end Flat racing at the course was announced. Warwick's final Flat fixture took place on 26 August 2014 with the last race being won by Louis Vee, ridden by Luke Morris.

Notable races

References

External links
Warwick Racecourse (Official website)
Course guide on GG.COM
Course guide on At The Races

 
Sports venues in Warwickshire
Horse racing venues in England
Racecourse
Grade II listed buildings in Warwickshire
Sports venues completed in 1808